The Charles University Rector election, 2009 was held when the first term of the incumbent Rector Václav Hampl expired. Hampl was elected for second term. Hampl's reelection was considered certain as he was the only candidate and 12 faculties of 17 endorsed him. Hampl received 55 votes from 61 delegates.

Hampl was inaugurated on 14 January 2010.

Notes

2009
Charles University Rector election
Charles University Rector election
Non-partisan elections